Edgar Harrison Friedman Jr. (May 23, 1924 – March 30, 2005) was an American film and television actor. He was known for playing freight agent Nathan Burke on 108 episodes of the American western television series Gunsmoke from 1966 to 1975.

Born in Lancaster, Ohio. Jordan guest-starred in numerous television programs including The Virginian, The Andy Griffith Show, Gunsmoke, Mission: Impossible, Voyage to the Bottom of the Sea and Land of the Giants. He died in March 2005 in Palm Desert, California, at the age of 80.

Filmography

Film

Television

References

External links 

Rotten Tomatoes profile

1924 births
2005 deaths
People from Lancaster, Ohio
Male actors from Ohio
American male film actors
American male television actors
20th-century American male actors
Male Western (genre) film actors
Western (genre) television actors
American stunt performers